Itirapina is a municipality in the state of São Paulo in Brazil. The population is 18,387 (2020 est.) in an area of 565 km2. The elevation is 770 m.

The municipality contains 56% of the Itirapina Ecological Station, created in 1984.

References

Municipalities in São Paulo (state)